Silvio Pietroboni (9 April 1904 – 18 February 1987) was an Italian association footballer who played as a midfielder. He competed in the 1928 Summer Olympics with the Italy national football team.

International career
Pietroboni was a member of the Italy national team which won the bronze medal in the 1928 Olympic football tournament.

Honours

Club
Inter
 Serie A champion: 1929–30

International 
Italy
 Central European International Cup: 1927-30
 Summer Olympics: Bronze 1928

References

External links

1904 births
1987 deaths
Italian footballers
Footballers at the 1928 Summer Olympics
Olympic footballers of Italy
Olympic bronze medalists for Italy
Italy international footballers
Serie A players
Inter Milan players
Calcio Lecco 1912 players
Olympic medalists in football
Medalists at the 1928 Summer Olympics
Association football midfielders
Footballers from Milan
S.G. Gallaratese A.S.D. players